Our Lady of the Most Holy Rosary — La Naval de Manila (Spanish: Nuestra Señora del Santísimo Rosario - La Naval de Manila; Tagalog: Mahal na Ina ng Santo Rosaryo ng La Naval de Manila; is a venerated title of the Blessed Virgin Mary associated with the same image in the Philippines.

Pious believers claim that the Virgin's intercession under this title helped to defeat the invading forces of the Protestant Dutch Republic during the Battles of La Naval de Manila in 1646.

Pope Pius X granted the image a decree of canonical coronation on 4 April 1906. The rite of coronation was executed by Dom Ambrose Agius on 5 October 1907. The Philippine government in 2009 designated the icon and its shrine as a National Cultural Treasure, making it one of the country's Cultural Properties.

Description

Measuring approximately four feet and eight inches high, the body is made of hardwood in the cage or Bastidor style. The face and hands, as well as the entire Child Jesus, are made of solid ivory. Since its creation, the statue – considered the oldest dated ivory carving in the Philippines – has always been decorated with elaborate garments and a crown.

Some 310,000 individuals led by professors of the University of Santo Tomas, donated their heirloom jewels, gemstones, gold and silver to the image for its Canonical Coronation in October 1907. These now form part of the icon's vast collection of elaborate regalia, with some pieces dating to the 18th century.

Pontifical approbations
The statue has merited several papal honours, namely the following:

 In an undated 1903 letter to Archbishop of Manila Jeremiah James Harty, the "Rosary Pope" Leo XIII issued an exhortation for people to come in pilgrimage to the Virgin's shrine in Santo Domingo Church (then in Intramuros).

 Pope Pius X granted the image a Canonical Coronation through Archbishop Dom Ambrose Agius of Malta on 4 April 1906 from the letter of Papal Audience granted to the Chaplain of Santa Catalina Normal School, Dominican priest Santiago Paya.  The ceremony was carried out on 5 October 1907.
 Pope Pius XII also sent an Apostolic Letter “Philippinas Insulas” on the occasion of the tricentenary of the Battle of La Naval de Manila on 31 July 1946.
 Pope Paul VI proclaimed her Patroness of Quezon City (where the icon's shrine was built following the destruction of Manila in the Second World War) on 13 October 1973.
 Pope John Paul II dedicated the Asian continent to the same title, using a replica of the icon on 18 February 1981. The Pontiff blessed the original image the next day in another public Mass.

History

In 1593, the new Spanish Governor-General Don Luis Pérez Dasmariñas, commissioned a statue of Our Lady of the Rosary for public veneration in memory of his recently deceased father. Under the direction of Captain Hernando de los Rios Coronel, the sculpture was made by an anonymous Chinese immigrant, who later converted to Christianity; this is the commonly cited reason for the statue's Asian features. The statue was later given to the Dominican friars, who installed it at the Santo Domingo Church.

In 1646, naval forces of the Dutch Republic made several repeated attempts to conquer the Philippines in a bid to control trade in Asia. The combined Spanish and Filipino forces who fought were said to have requested the intercession of the Virgin through the statue prior to battle. They were urged to place themselves under the protection of Our Lady of the Rosary and to pray the rosary repeatedly. They went on to rebuff the continued attacks by the superior Dutch fleet, engaging in five major battles at sea and losing only fifteen members of the Spanish Navy. After the Dutch retreat, in fulfillment of their vow, the survivors walked barefoot to the shrine in gratitude to the Virgin.

Later, on 9 April 1662, the cathedral chapter of the Archdiocese of Manila declared the naval victory a miraculous event owed to the intercession of the Virgin Mary, declaring:

Pope Pius X authorized granting the statue a canonical crown in 1906, which was bestowed by the Apostolic Delegate to the Philippines, The Most Rev. Ambrose Agius, O.S.B. During the Japanese bombardment in 1942, fearing that the statue would be destroyed, church authorities hid the statue at the University of Santo Tomas until 1946, the 300th anniversary of the battles.

The statue was transferred in October 1954 to a new shrine built to house it inside the new Santo Domingo Church in Quezon City–the sixth Santo Domingo Church since its erection in the late sixteenth century. For this journey, devotees constructed a boat-shaped carriage to carry the image to its new home, which was declared her National Shrine by the Catholic Bishops Conference of the Philippines.
In October 1973, La Naval was formally declared the patroness of Quezon City, at that time the national capital. Filipino Archbishop Mariano Gaviola declared her Patroness of the Philippine Navy in 1975, a patronage invoked until this day.

During the People Power Revolution of February 1986, a replica of the statue was brought in procession to the Malacañan Palace by the Dominican friars, in a peaceful protest of the state of martial law instituted by President Ferdinand Marcos. The replica was also brought to the eastern gate of Camp Crame, the police headquarters where the rebel forces headed by Juan Ponce Enrile and Fidel V. Ramos were confined during the uprising. Many Filipino Catholics attribute the revolution's peaceful victory to the miraculous intervention of the Blessed Virgin Mary.

Filipino historian Nick Joaquín attributed one of the red jewels in one of the statue's crowns to an old legend of a giant serpent found in the Pasig River; the local folktale is more likely a metaphor of the triumph of Christianity over paganism. The other crown was supposedly inscribed and donated by King Norodom of Cambodia in 1872, one having disappeared after a burglary in 1930 while another one was simply two pearls adorning the orbs of the statue.

Notable events

The funeral service of former senator Benigno Aquino Jr. was held in the image's shrine after his assassination in August 1983. Other notable funerals held in the shrine include those of renowned Filipino actor Fernando Poe Jr. in 2004 and Doña María Ejercito, the mother of former President Joseph Estrada in 2009.

Journalist and television personality Korina Sanchez married then-Senator Manuel A. Roxas II in a televised Spanish-style wedding in front of the image on 27 October 2009.

In December 2011, the Eternal Word Television Network featured the image as the "Grandest Marian Icon in the Philippines" on an episode of the programme Mary: Mother of the Philippines.

The image, its church and convent, along with the other objects stored in the complex were declared a "National Cultural Treasure" by the National Museum of the Philippines on 4 October 2012. This declaration is in accordance with Republic Act 10066 ("National Cultural Heritage Act of 2009") announced officially by the Catholic Bishops' Conference of the Philippines and by the National Museum.

In 2020, for the first time in the shrine's history, the feast of Our Lady of La Naval was simplistic, lasted for 15 days, and did not involve the usual enthronement and other festivities, due to the threat of COVID-19 and prevailing quarantine policies in the Philippines. The same happened in 2021, but this time, all festivities and novenas were available through live streaming, and due to eased restrictions, limited participation was allowed.

Gallery

See also
 Catholic Church in the Philippines
 Cathedral Basilica of the Immaculate Conception
 Santo Niño de Cebu
 Our Lady of Manaoag
 Roman Catholic Diocese of Cubao
 Quezon City

References

External links
 Shrine of Our Lady of Guidance
 Shrine of Our Lady of Manaoag

Titles of Mary
Catholic devotions
Statues of the Virgin Mary
Shrines to the Virgin Mary
Philippine Navy
Buildings and structures in Quezon City
Roman Catholic churches in Quezon City
Roman Catholic churches completed in 1596
1590s establishments in the Philippines
16th-century Roman Catholic church buildings in the Philippines